The Commonwealth Mountain and Ultradistance Running Championships, founded in 2009, was a biennial fell running tournament operated by the Commonwealth Games Federation. It had its last edition in 2011.

Editions

See also
World Mountain Running Championships
European Mountain Running Championships
World Long Distance Mountain Running Championships
Commonwealth Mountain and Ultradistance Running Championships
NACAC Mountain Running Championships
South American Mountain Running Championships

References

Mountain running competitions
Recurring sporting events established in 2009
Recurring sporting events disestablished in 2011
Commonwealth sports competitions
International athletics competitions
Defunct athletics competitions